The Old Billerica Road Historic District encompasses a rural residential stretch of Old Billerica Road in Bedford, Massachusetts.  It is bounded on the north by Eli-Wil Farm Road, and on the south by Mitchell Grant Lane, and includes houses numbered 229-301 Old Billerica Road.  The area represents a cross-section of residential housing in Bedford, encompassing its agrarian origins and its development through the 19th century to a suburban community in the 20th.  The district also has a well-preserved series of fieldstone walls, lining both the roads and some of the property boundaries.

The district was listed on the National Register of Historic Places in 2007.

See also
National Register of Historic Places listings in Middlesex County, Massachusetts

References

Historic districts in Middlesex County, Massachusetts
Buildings and structures in Bedford, Massachusetts
National Register of Historic Places in Middlesex County, Massachusetts
Historic districts on the National Register of Historic Places in Massachusetts